Javier Horacio Umbides (born 9 February 1982) is an Argentine former professional footballer who mostly played as an attacking midfielder.

Career
Born in Monte Quemado, Santiago del Estero, Umbides began playing professional football for All Boys from 1999 to 2000. He then moved to Argentinos Juniors where he played only one season until moving to Estudiantes (BA). After two years at Estudiantes (BA), he moved on loan to Defensores de Belgrano where he played for 11 matches in Primera B Nacional without scoring a goal. He returned to Estudiantes (BA) for two more seasons until moving to Defensa y Justicia for 2007-08 year. On 2008 he returned to All Boys after eight years.

Greece
In 2009, the 27-year-old moved to Greece to sign with Olympiakos Volou where he played 49 matches, scoring 11 goals. In September 2011 he moved to Aris FC on a free transfer, because a scandal which burst out in Greek Football and punished Olympiakos Volou and Kavala relegate them to Semi-professional League Delta Ethniki. Umbides played his first match for Aris F.C. at 2 October 2011, against Skoda Xanthi at home, 3 days after his sign.
In 2012, is about to move to PAOK

After providing several assists and also being the man of the matchday 12, Umbides scored his first goal with Aris shirt on 28 December in the home-win against Doxa Dramas. He scored the second one with yellow jersey against Skoda Xanthi, in a 0-2 win for Aris. He already was the leader of the team and fans love him.

In 2012, he moved to Orduspor. He scored his first goal against Kastamonuspor in a Turkish Cup match. He also scored a wonderful goal against Gençlerbirliği S.K. in a 2-1 home win.

After the end of the season, moved back to Greece to sign with Atromitos Athens, on 26 June 2013.
Atromitos midfielder is on the radar of several Greek clubs according to reports in the Greek press. The Argentine midfielder impresses for the 2014-15 season with his displays and according to rumours a club from Salonika, seemingly PAOK or Iraklis, has expressed an interest in signing him. On 16 May 2017, Atromitos officially announced the extension of experienced attacking midfielder' contract until the summer of 2018.On 23 May 2018, Atromitos officially announced the extension of experienced Argentine attacking midfielder's contract, until the summer of 2019. On 20 April 2019, Umbides at the age of 37 renewed his contract at Atromitos till the summer of 2020. The next season will be the seventh in the Peristeri team for the Argentinian middlefielder.
On 25 July 2019, he scored his second goal in UEFA competitions, as he opened the scoring after 21 minutes  with a tremendous half volley effort, helping his club have one foot in the third qualifying round of the Europa League after beating Dunajská Streda 2-1 in Slovakia.

On 15 May 2021, he officially announced his retirement from professional football, and with a penalty kick was the only scorer in a 1-0 home win game against Volos F.C. The Argentinian made a change shortly before the end of the match with standing ovation and applause from those present on the field and with him not holding back his tears.

Career statistics in Europe

Club

Honours

Individual
Super League Greece Top assist provider: 2013–14
Super League Greece Team of the Year: 2013–14

References

External links

1982 births
Living people
Argentine footballers
Argentine expatriate footballers
Defensa y Justicia footballers
All Boys footballers
Estudiantes de Buenos Aires footballers
Olympiacos Volos F.C. players
Aris Thessaloniki F.C. players
Orduspor footballers
Atromitos F.C. players
Primera B Metropolitana players
Süper Lig players
Super League Greece players
Football League (Greece) players
Expatriate footballers in Greece
Expatriate footballers in Turkey
Association football midfielders
People from Santiago del Estero
Sportspeople from Santiago del Estero Province